The 2014 IMSA Tudor United SportsCar Championship (TUSC) was the inaugural season of the International Motor Sports Association's new series created out of a merger of the Rolex Sports Car Series and the American Le Mans Series and the first to be held under the name as the Tudor United SportsCar Championship. It began with the 24 Hours of Daytona, the first time since the 1997 IMSA GT Championship season that IMSA sanctioned an event at Daytona International Speedway on 25 January and ended on 4 October at Petit Le Mans.  It was the 44th overall season of IMSA GT championship racing tracing its lineage to the 1971 IMSA GT Championship.

Classes

The class structures were revealed on March 14 and are as follows:

Prototype (P) – a merger of the RSCS Daytona Prototypes, the ALMS P2 Le Mans Prototypes, and the experimental DeltaWing. The ALMS P1 class will be discontinued.
Prototype Challenge (PC) – the ALMS spec Corvette-engined Oreca prototypes.
GT Le Mans (GTLM) – grand touring cars from the ALMS
GT Daytona (GTD) – a merger of GT and GX cars from the RSCS and the ALMS GT Challenge Porsche GT3s.

Car capacities
Due to the expectation of a large number of entries for the series, IMSA announced preliminary car capacities for each class on October 11, 2013. They noted, however, that they are subject to change based on factors such as the number of full-season entries in each class.

Prototype – Limited to 19 entries with the exceptions of Sebring, Long Beach, Laguna Seca, Detroit, and Indianapolis, wherein 20 entries would be allowed.
Prototype Challenge – Limited to 10 entries for all events except Kansas and Virginia International, wherein 19 entries will be permitted.
GT Le Mans – Limited to 19 entries at Virginia International, 16 at Long Beach, 14 at Sebring and Indianapolis, and 12 entries at all other events.
GT Daytona – Limited to 19 entries at all events with the exception of Detroit, where 21 entries would  be allowed to compete.

Driver limits and classifications
Teams will be limited to utilizing a maximum of three drivers per car for events less than 6 hours in length. This capacity increases to four drivers for races from 6 hours up to 12 hours in length, and five drivers for the 24 Hours of Daytona.

The series will utilize a driver classification system, rating each driver as platinum, gold, silver, or bronze based on numerous factors regarding their competition history. Platinum and gold rated drivers are considered "pro" drivers, while silver and bronze rated drivers will be considered "amateur" or "gentleman" drivers.

In PC and GTD, a maximum of one Platinum or Gold-rated driver is permitted for two or three driver team combinations, with it being increased to two for Daytona and Sebring, should they utilize four or five-driver squads, however should a car utilize two platinum or gold-rated drivers, it must also utilize at least two silver or bronze-rated drivers, each meeting the minimum required driving time. Should this requirement go unfulfilled the team may be penalized at the discretion of the stewards, up to and including exclusion from the race results.

There are no driver classification restrictions in the P and GTLM classes.

A driver will be allowed to drive up to two cars in a single event, given that all minimum and maximum drive time limits are adhered to.

Drive time limits
The minimum and maximum allowable driving time for an individual driver vary by race and class as specified in the table below. No driver may drive for more than 4 hours of any 6 hour period at any time and that a minimum of two drivers must be used in each race. An exception are Prototype Challenge races with a two 45-minute segment format. These require a silver or bronze-rated driver for the first segment. Teams may use another driver with any rating in the second segment, but are not required to do so.

Series development

On July 31, 2013, a tire partnership was announced, with Continental Tire serving as the exclusive tire supplier for the Prototype, Prototype Challenge and GT Daytona classes.  Continental was previously the specification tire of the Rolex Sports Car Series, as well as the Prototype Challenge class in the American Le Mans Series.

On December 11, 2013, Michelin announced that they will supply tires for the GT Le Mans Class Teams Corvette Racing, BMW Team RLL, Risi Competizione, SRT Motorsports, Aston Martin Racing and the new Porsche North America team. Michelin previously supplied tires for LMP1, LMP2 and GT Classes of American Le Mans Series, and was the spec-tire of PC class from 2010 to 2012.

Rule changes

The series introduced several procedural changes after the first two races of 2014:

 Enforcement of an IMSA rule requiring the display of the car’s number on its in-car cameras.
Upgraded video review equipment to high definition (HD).
A new system for cross-checking cars and drivers involved in on-track incidents.
Addition of a third driver advisor to work alongside the IMSA Race Director and two driver advisors to assist with evaluating responsibility in incidents and other on-track situations.
At events where there is only one prototype class in a race, the pits will be opened for that class when the field is packed up and while GT cars are still performing the Pass-Around procedure. This change will expedite the full-course caution process by a full lap.
The “Lap-Down Wave-By” procedure – which provides a strategic opportunity for cars a lap or more behind to gain a lap back by staying on course while leaders make pit stops – will be more limited in its application. There will be no Lap-Down Wave-By in races less than two hours and 30 minutes in length. For races between two-and-a-half hours through six hours, the Lap-Down Wave-By will be used only once in any 90-minute period after 60 minutes from the start of a race. No Lap-Down Wave-By will be used in the last 30 minutes of a race.
Efforts also will be made to use “Debris Yellows” where a situation is likely to involve the simple removal of debris or the flat-tow of a stopped car to a safe location. A Debris Yellow includes the Pass-Around procedure, but the pits remain closed until the race is restarted.

Schedule

Official Testing
Three official preseason tests were conducted for 2014 for both team testing and to determine balance of performance adjustments for the classes. They were as follows:

November 16–17, 2013 at Sebring International Raceway
November 19–20, 2013 at Daytona International Speedway
January 3–5 at Daytona International Speedway

One official test took place between the 24 Hours of Daytona and 12 Hours of Sebring.

February 20–21 at Sebring International Raceway

Race schedule
The preliminary 2014 schedule was released on September 20, 2013 and featured twelve rounds.  All circuits are carried over from the 2013 schedules of both the American Le Mans and Rolex Series. Circuits dropped were longtime sports car venues at Lime Rock Park and Mid-Ohio, as well as Barber and Baltimore.

Some rounds on the schedule will feature only some of the four classes in the USCC. Long Beach will only feature the Prototype and GTLM classes, Detroit will have all classes except GTLM, and Virginia will feature two separate races: an event for the GTLM and GTD classes, and another race solely for the Prototype Challenge class.  This will give each category only 11 races in their respective championships, excepting the Prototype Challenge class, which will contest just 10 rounds.

The endurance races at Daytona, Sebring, Watkins Glen and Road Atlanta will retain their traditional lengths, while four events will have the regular 2 hour and 45 minute lengths (Mosport, Indianapolis, Road America, Austin), and the two street races will have 1 hour, 40 minute races (Long Beach and Detroit).

On October 11, 2013 a revised schedule was released. The key changes to the schedule included the addition of a stand-alone Prototype Challenge event to be held at Kansas Speedway on June 7. Subsequently, the Prototype Challenge events at Detroit and Canadian Tire Motorsport Park were removed, leaving the class with a 10 race schedule.  It was also announced that two events would be contested during the May 4 event at Mazda Raceway Laguna Seca. One would feature the Prototype and GT Le Mans classes, while the other would feature the Prototype Challenge and GT Daytona classes.

It is expected that the Prototype Challenge events which will occur at Kansas Speedway and Virginia International Raceway will be combined with the Cooper Tires Prototype Lites development series in a two-segment race format.

The team winners of the North American Endurance Cup will receive prize money in each class: $100,000 for P or GTLM and $50,000 for PC or GTD.

The Rolex 24 at Daytona was broadcast on Fox, Fox Sports 1, Fox Sports 2 and IMSA.com in stages as TV slots change.

Notes
Run in conjunction with the Cooper Tires Prototype Lites series.

Entries
On December 6, 2013, IMSA unveiled the entry lists for the 2014 season, confirming entries with full and partial season statuses as well as revealing alternate entries for multiple classes due to an oversubscribed field.

Prototype
All entries use Continental tyres.

Notes
Team Sahlen had initially announced intentions to campaign a pair of BMW-Riley Daytona Prototypes, but on November 9, 2013, it was announced that they would not compete in the championship and would instead focus on competing in the Continental Tire Sports Car Challenge ST class.
GAINSCO/Bob Stallings Racing had planned to compete in the North American Endurance Cup, but pulled out of the championship following a crash at the Daytona 24 Hours that destroyed the car and injured Memo Gidley.  Team owner Bob Stallings announced that he was shutting down the team for the remainder of the season.
Before Sebring, Starworks Motorsport switched to a new V6 Honda engine for their #78 Daytona Prototype.
Before Lone Star Le Mans, OAK Racing switched to a new Ligier JS P2 prototype with Honda engine.

Prototype Challenge
All entries use an Oreca FLM09 chassis powered by a Chevrolet LS3 6.2 L V8 on Continental tyres.

GTLM Class

Notes
The Team Falken Tire entry was a full-season entry, but did not participate in the 24 Hours of Daytona, and began their season with the 12 Hours of Sebring.
While having previously planned on running the North American Endurance Cup events of the 2014 United SportsCar Championship, Aston Martin Racing elected to withdraw from the series after a disappointing showing at Daytona and instead focus on the upcoming 2014 FIA World Endurance Championship season.

GTD Class
All entries use Continental tyres.

Results and standings
Bold indicates overall winner. 
 In Laguna Seca, there were two overall winners: one from race which included Prototype and GTLM classes, and other from race which included PC and GTD classes.
 In Kansas, there was one overall winner from two combined races which included PC class only.
 In Virginia, there were also two overall winners: one from two combined races which included PC class only, and other from race which included GTLM and GTD classes.

Championship standings
Championship points are awarded based on finishing positions as shown below.  The points system from the Rolex Sports Car Series has been carried over into the new series.

Additionally, each driver who competes in a race, receives one point.

Prototype

Drivers (Top 10)
João Barbosa and Christian Fittipaldi won the championship at Petit Le Mans.

Notes
 Drivers denoted by a † did not complete sufficient laps in order to score points.

Teams (top 10)
The No.5 Action Express Racing won the championship at Petit Le Mans.

Engine manufacturers

Prototype Challenge

Drivers (Top 10)
Jon Bennett and  Colin Braun won the championship at Circuit of the Americas.

Notes
 Drivers denoted by a † did not complete sufficient laps in order to score points.
 The results shown from VIR are a compilation of both of the double-header segments based on total points earned.

Teams

Notes
 Teams denoted by a † did not complete sufficient laps in order to score points.
 The results shown from VIR are a compilation of both of the double-header segments based on total points earned.

GTLM

Drivers (Top 10)
Kuno Wittmer won the championship at Petit Le Mans.

Notes
 Drivers denoted by a † did not complete sufficient laps in order to score points.

Teams (top 10)
The #93 SRT Motorsports won the championship at Petit Le Mans.

Manufacturers

GTD

Drivers (Top 10)
Dane Cameron won the championship at Petit Le Mans.

Notes
 Drivers denoted by a † did not complete sufficient laps in order to score points.

Teams (Top 10)
The #94 Turner Motorsport team won the championship at Petit Le Mans.

Manufacturers

Notes

References

 
WeatherTech SportsCar Championship seasons